Nasrullah Sadiqi Zada Nili (Dari: , known as Sadiqi Zada Nili,) is an ethnic Hazara politician from Afghanistan. He is the representative of the Daikundi people in the fifteenth and sixteenth parliamentary sessions of the Afghanistan Parliament.

Early life 
Nasrullah Sadiqi Zada Nili, son of the jihadist leader Muhammad Hussain Sadiqi Nili, was born on 1966 in Nili district of Daikundi province. Sadiqi Zada Nili has a bachelor's degree in Islamic sciences. He was a commander in the Nili district and a member of the Hizb-i-Wahdat Party when was a single and united party during the Jihad in Afghanistan.

In December 2015, Sadiqi Zada Nili was taken hostage by Taliban during a visit to his own province Daikundi. After being 9 hours hostage he was able to flee the Taliban and bring himself to government forces.

Notes 

Living people
1966 births
Hazara politicians
Members of the House of the People (Afghanistan)
People from Daykundi Province
Hezbe Wahdat politicians